Chełm Voivodeship (1793) was created during the Grodno Sejm on November 23, 1793. The Voivodeship existed on Chełm Land. It was not fully organised because of the start of Kościuszko Uprising in 1794.

The Voivodeship consisted of three parts:
 Chełm Land
 Luków Land
 Parczew Land

References 
Volumina legum t. 10 Konstytucje Sejmu Grodzieńskiego z 1793 roku, Poznań 1952

Voivodeships of the Polish–Lithuanian Commonwealth